Teodorico or Theodorico is a masculine given name which may refer to:

 Teodorico Teo Fabi (born 1955), Italian race car driver
 Teodorico Boyet Fernandez (born 1971), Filipino former basketball player and coach
 Teodorico Pedrini (1671–1746), Italian Vincentian priest, missionary for 36 years at the Imperial Court of China, musician and composer
 Teodorico Ranieri (died 1306), Italian cardinal, Archbishop of Pisa and Bishop of Palestrina
 Theodorico Haroldo de Oliveira (1937–1990), Brazilian footballer
 Theodorico de Sacadura Botte (1902–1987), Portuguese colonial administrator and entrepreneur in Mozambique

See also
 Theodore
 Theodoric

Masculine given names